Loyno may refer to:
Loyno (rural locality), name of several rural localities in Russia
Loyola University New Orleans, a university in the United States referred to as LoyNO